On 30 January 1971, an Indian Airlines domestic Fokker F27, also named "Ganga", flying from Srinagar Airport to the Jammu-Satwari Airport, was hijacked by two Kashmiri separatists belonging to the National Liberation Front (NLF, the antecedent of Jammu and Kashmir Liberation Front). The hijackers were Hashim Qureshi and his cousin Ashraf Qureshi. The aircraft was flown to Lahore Airport in Pakistan where the passengers and the crew were released and the aircraft was burnt down.

Ganga was one of the oldest aircraft in the Indian Airlines fleet and was already withdrawn from service but was re-inducted days before the hijacking.

India retaliated to the hijacking and subsequent burning by banning overflights of Pakistani aircraft over Indian territory. The ban, occurring in the run-up to the December 1971 war between the countries, had a significant impact on troop movement into the erstwhile East Pakistan, now Bangladesh. Pakistan reacted by charging the hijackers and other NLF militants with conspiracy. The crackdown severely weakened militant organisation. Subsequently, the leader of the movement, Amanullah Khan, moved to Britain, where he established a new organisation called the Jammu and Kashmir Liberation Front.

Planning

Hashim Qureshi, a Srinagar resident who went to Peshawar on family business in 1969, met Maqbool Bhat of the National Liberation Front (NLF), a self-declared 'armed wing' of the Azad Kashmir Plebiscite Front. Qureshi was persuaded to join the NLF and given an ideological education and lessons in guerrilla tactics in Rawalpindi. In order to draw the world's attention to the Kashmiri independence movement, the NLF planned an airline hijacking fashioned after the Dawson's Field hijackings by the Palestinian militants. Hashim Qureshi, along with his cousin Ashraf Qureshi, was ordered to execute one. A former Pakistani air force pilot Jamshed Manto trained him for the task. However, Qureshi was arrested by the Indian Border Security Force when he tried to reenter the Indian-administered Kashmir with arms and equipment. He negotiated his way out by claiming to help find other conspirators that were allegedly in the Indian territory, and sought an appointment in the Border Security Force to provide such help. Maqbool Bhat sent replacement equipment for the hijacking, but it fell into the hands of a double agent, who then turned it over to the Indian authorities. Undeterred, the Qureshis made look-alike explosives out of wood and hijacked an Indian Airlines aircraft called Ganga on 30 January 1971.

Burning
The hijackers landed the aircraft at Lahore and demanded the release of 36 NLF prisoners lodged in Indian jails. However, they succumbed to pressure from the airport authorities and ended up releasing all the passengers and the crew. Years later, Ashraf Qureshi admitted that they were naive and didn't realise that "the passengers were more important than the actual aircraft." Pakistani Minister Zulfikar Bhutto showed up at the airport and paid a handsome tribute to the hijackers. Indian Government then refused to carry out the demands. The aircraft lay on the tarmac for eighty hours, during which the Pakistani security personnel thoroughly searched the aircraft and removed papers and postal bags they found in it. Eventually, upon the advice of the authorities, Hashim Qureshi burnt the aircraft.

Crackdown

For some time, the Qureshis were lauded as heroes. After India reacted by banning overflight of Pakistani aircraft over India, the Pakistani authorities claimed that the hijack was staged by India, and arrested the hijackers and all their collaborators. A one-man investigation committee headed by Justice Noorul Arifeen declared the hijacking to be an Indian conspiracy, citing Qureshi's appointment in the Border Security Force. In addition to the hijackers, Maqbool Bhat and 150 other NLF fighters were arrested. Seven people were eventually brought to trial (the rest being held without charges). The High Court acquitted all of them of treason charges. Hashim Qureshi alone was convicted of terrorism and sentenced to seven years in prison. Ironically, Ashraf Qureshi was released even though he was an equal participant in the hijacking. This is said to have been due to a deal made by Zulikar Bhutto, by now the President of Pakistan, who declared that he would convict one hijacker but release the other.

Amanullah Khan, the leader of the Plebiscite Front, was also imprisoned for 15 months in a Gilgit prison during 1970–72, accused of being an Indian agent. He was released after protests broke out in Gilgit. Thirteen of his colleagues were sentenced to 14 years in prison, but released after a year. According to Hashim Qureshi, 400 activists of the Plebiscite Front and NLF were arrested in Pakistan after the Ganga hijacking. Abdul Khaliq Ansari, who was arrested and tortured, testified in the High Court that the Ganga hijacking had emboldened the people to question the corrupt practices of the Azad Kashmir leaders and, in reaction, the government arrested them and forced them to confess to being Indian agents.

To escape the close surveillance and pressure from the Pakistan government, Amanullah Khan and Abdul Khaliq Ansari moved to the UK, where they found active support from the Mirpuri diaspora. Khan converted the UK branch of the Plebiscite Front into a new organisation Jammu and Kashmir Liberation Front, which eventually spearheaded the Kashmir insurgency in the 1980s.

See also 

 List of hijackings of Indian aeroplanes#1970s
 List of aircraft hijackings#1970s
 List of accidents and incidents involving airliners by location#India
 List of accidents and incidents involving airliners by airline (D–O)#I
 List of accidents and incidents involving commercial aircraft#1971

Further reading

References

Bibliography

External links 

 

Aircraft hijackings in India
Aviation accidents and incidents in 1971
Aviation accidents and incidents in India
1971
Accidents and incidents involving the Fokker F27
India–Pakistan relations
1971 in India
Arson in Pakistan
January 1971 events in Asia
Aircraft hijackings in Pakistan